Save Me is the third studio album recorded by the Richmond, Virginia, based Pat McGee Band. It is a marked departure from the band's previous records as the familiar acoustic guitars and three part harmonies were eschewed in favor of a more raw, electric sound. Four tracks were produced in California with Marti Frederiksen, who had collaborated on their writing. The remainder of the album was laid down in Avatar Studios during late 2003.

WBR release
The Warner Bros. Records version of Save Me was released on April 6, 2004. It was at once both praised and criticized by long-term fans of the band.  "Beautiful Ways" was the lead single from the album and was released to radio in July; it failed to break into the Billboard Hot 100 but climbed as high as #36 on the Billboard adult top 40 chart.

Track listing
"Beautiful Ways" - 3:53
"Must Have Been Love" - 4:27
"You and I" - 3:59
"Now" - 3:43
"Don't Give Up" - 4:24
"At It Again" - 3:24
"Annabel" - 3:58
"Never Around" - 4:23
"Wonderful" - 3:11
"Set Me Free" - 3:53
"Shady" - 4:55

Enhanced content
Save Me is an Enhanced CD that contains a twelve-minute QuickTime video showing the making of the album. It is a mix of behind-the-scenes studio footage and live concert excerpts that were filmed at the Paradise Rock Club in Boston. Guitarist Brian Fechino mixed the audio for the film.

Kirtland re-release
In the fall of 2004, WBR officially stopped supporting Save Me and the Pat McGee Band was dropped from the label. The band was still allowed ownership of the tapes and used them to shop for a new label. Kirtland Records signed the band in April 2005 and repackaged and re-released Save Me on June 28, 2005, with five new acoustic bonus tracks. "Must Have Been Love" was remixed and became the album's second single, released in May approximately one month ahead of the album's street date. A music video was also filmed for "Must Have Been Love" but it has not been seen much outside of internet music sites.

Track listing
"Beautiful Ways" - 3:53
"Must Have Been Love" - 4:05
"You and I" - 3:59
"Now" - 3:43
"Don't Give Up" - 4:24
"At It Again" - 3:24
"Annabel" - 3:58
"Never Around" - 4:23
"Wonderful" - 3:11
"Set Me Free" - 3:53
"Shady" - 4:55
"Annabel" (Acoustic) - 4:20
"Don't Give Up" (Acoustic) - 4:17
"Now" (Acoustic) - 3:45
"You and I" (Acoustic) - 3:54
"At It Again" (Acoustic) - 3:24

Enhanced content
The Kirtland Save Me is also an enhanced CD, but has entirely different content from the WBR version. A new Flash menu, similar in design to the new album cover, has a small Flash video containing one of the first cuts of the "Must Have Been Love" music video.

Personnel
Pat McGee – lead vocals, guitar
Chardy McEwan – percussion
Chris Williams – drums
Brian Fechino – lead guitar
Jonathan Williams – keyboards, backing vocals
John Small – bass guitar
Marti Frederiksen – Hammond organ on "Annabel"
Allison and Laura Veltz of Cecilia – backing vocals
String section on "You and I":
Adam Grabois – cello
Joyce Hammann – violin
Conay Kuo – viola
Victor Lawrence – cello
Ale Mahave – viola
Todd Reynolds – violin
Mary Rowell – violin
Laura Seaton – violin
Marti Sweet – violin
Paul Woodiel – violin

References
Customer reviews of Save Me, Amazon.com. Retrieved January 2, 2007.
PMB onto new charts..., PMBoard, 2004-7-8. Retrieved January 2, 2007.
Valerie Cwiekowski, Pat McGee Band at Copley Square, Boston Live, 2004-8-19. Retrieved January 2, 2007.

2004 albums
2005 albums
Pat McGee Band albums
Albums produced by Marti Frederiksen